Tactical Intervention was a video game developed by Minh "Gooseman" Le, the co-creator of Counter-Strike. It was a multiplayer first-person shooter in which a team of counter-terrorists face off against a team of terrorists, much like Counter-Strike.
The game featured dogs, riot shields and the ability to rappel. Tactical Intervention entered closed beta for North America on May 28, 2010; however, this did not result in the release of the game. OGPlanet has since picked up Tactical Intervention for release in North America.
The game has also since been shown at GDC 2012 in San Francisco, where Gooseman demonstrated the game and was interviewed by various gaming media including GameTrailers, IGN, GameSpot and more. Joystiq launched its exclusive beta on March 4 until March 8. OGPlanet launched the open beta from the March 14 up to the March 25. They also revealed the game's release date as March 28, 2013.

On June 10, 2013, game servers were brought down because "player involvement has yet to reach a level for OGPlanet to sustain its future service".

The game has since been picked up by German publisher RNTS games and appeared at Gamescom in Cologne, Germany in August 2013. The game was also released on Steam worldwide with RNTS.

Reception 

Tactical Intervention received negative reviews upon its full release. On Metacritic, the game holds a score of 47/100 based on 7 reviews, indicating "generally unfavorable reviews."

References

External links 
 Official website
 Tactical Intervention on IGN

2013 video games
First-person shooters
First-person shooter multiplayer online games
MacOS games
Multiplayer online games
Multiplayer video games
Source (game engine) games
Video games developed in South Korea
Windows games
OGPlanet games